The Manus bent-toed gecko (Cyrtodactylus crustulus) is a species of gecko endemic to Manus Island of Papua New Guinea.

References

 http://reptile-database.reptarium.cz/species?genus=Cyrtodactylus&species=crustulus

Reptiles of Papua New Guinea
Cyrtodactylus
Reptiles described in 2020
Taxa named by Paul M. Oliver
Taxa named by Ryan Hartman (herpetologist)
Taxa named by Cameron D. Turner
Taxa named by Taylor A. Wilde
Taxa named by Christopher C. Austin
Taxa named by Stephen J. Richards
Geckos of New Guinea